Go for It... Live! is a live album by California stoner rock band Fu Manchu. It was recorded during the California Crossing World Tour of 2002. It is the first album to feature Scott Reeder on drums.

Track listing

Personnel
Scott Hill - vocals, guitar
Bob Balch – guitar
Brad Davis – bass
Scott Reeder – drums

References

2003 live albums
Fu Manchu (band) albums
SPV/Steamhammer live albums